Dr.Habibullah Baig was an Indian politician who served as member of the Madras Legislative Assembly and mayor of Madras during 1967-68. He belonged to the Muslim League. He defeated K. S. G. Haja Shareef in the 1967 Tamil Nadu Legislative Assembly election for the Harbour Assembly constituency.

References

 

Mayors of Chennai
Indian Union Muslim League politicians from Tamil Nadu
Year of birth missing
Year of death missing
Members of the Tamil Nadu Legislative Assembly